The Johnny Cash Children's Album is the 49th album by country singer Johnny Cash, released on Columbia Records in 1975 featuring recordings made between January 1972 and October 1973. As the title implies, it contains songs written for children. Among others, this includes "Tiger Whitehead", a song later released in an acoustic version on Cash's posthumous Personal File album in 2006. Most of the songs on the album had not been performed by Cash before. "Old Shep" had been performed by Elvis Presley, among others. One track recorded in 1972 was previously released on LP: "I Got a Boy (And His Name is John)" was first made available on the 1972 album International Superstar. It is a tongue-in-cheek duet between Cash and his wife, June Carter Cash, about their son, John Carter Cash.

The Johnny Cash Children's Album was reissued in 2006  through Legacy Recordings, with four bonus tracks, including Henry Clay Work's "My Grandfather's Clock".  An early version of "My Grandfather's Clock" was recorded in 1958 and is available on Songs of Our Soil. The song "Old Shep" was also re-released on the 2005 box set The Legend.

Track listing

Note: Johnny Cash first recorded a version of "My Grandfather's Clock" on 12 March 1959 for Songs of Our Soil

Personnel
Johnny Cash - vocals, acoustic guitar
Ray Edenton, Larry Gatlin, David Jones, Red Lane, Jerry Shook - guitar
Carl Perkins, Bob Wootton - electric guitar
Larry Butler, Larry McCoy, Bill Pursell, Bill Walker, Jerry Whitehurst - piano
Marshall Grant - bass
W.S. "Fluke" Holland, William Don Favorite - drums
June Carter Cash, Rosie Nix - backing vocals

Additional personnel
Produced by Johnny Cash and Charlie Bragg
Tracks 4,5,8,9,12,13,15,15 Produced by Larry Butler
Reissue Produced by Gregg Geller
Mastered by Vic Anesini at Sony Music Studios, New York
Legacy A&R: Steve Berkowitz
Project Designer: John Jackson
A&R Coordination: Jeremy Holiday and Stacey Boyle
Art Direction: Howard Fritzson
Design: Ron Kellum/Kellum McClain Inc.
Project Manager: Triana D'Orazio
Photography: Al Clayton (original LP), J.P. Philips (two black-and-white photos)

References

External links
 Luma Electronic entry on The Johnny Cash Children's Album

Children's Album, The Johnny Cash
Children's Album, The Johnny Cash
Albums produced by Larry Butler (producer)
Children's Album, The Johnny Cash
Children's music albums by American artists